Aphrodes is a genus of leafhoppers (family Cicadellidae). The species of this genus are found in Eurasia and North America.

Species
The following species are recognised in the genus Aphrodes:
 
 Aphrodes aestuarina (Edwards, 1908)
 Aphrodes albifrons 
 Aphrodes albigera 
 Aphrodes astrachanicus Emeljanov, 1964
 Aphrodes bicinctus (Schrank, 1776)
 Aphrodes bolivari Melichar, 1902
 Aphrodes brachycephalus Linnavuori, 1979
 Aphrodes brachyptera China, 1938
 Aphrodes carinatus Stål, 1864
 Aphrodes costata Panzer, 1799
 Aphrodes daiwenicus Kuoh, 1981
 Aphrodes diminuta Ribaut, 1952
 Aphrodes elongatus Lethierry, 1876
 Aphrodes falklandica Enderlein, 1912
 Aphrodes fisulii Logvinenko, 1983
 Aphrodes furcillatus Sáringer, 1959
 Aphrodes gurjevae Emeljanov, 1972
 Aphrodes hamiltoni Quartau & Borges, 2003
 Aphrodes laevus Rey, 1891
 Aphrodes lusitanicus Rodrigues, 1968
 Aphrodes makarovi Zachvatkin, 1948
 Aphrodes montanus Vilbaste, 1965
 Aphrodes nisamianus Logvinenko, 1983
 Aphrodes nuristanicus Dlabola, 1957
 Aphrodes ochromelas Gmelin, 1789
 Aphrodes paralongus Dlabola, 1960
 Aphrodes peltastes Burmeister, 1835
 Aphrodes petrophilus Lindberg, 1954
 Aphrodes puella Curtis, 1837
 Aphrodes pulcher Dlabola, 1960
 Aphrodes samuricus Tshmir, 1977
 Aphrodes siracusae Matsumura, 1908
 Aphrodes thais Linnavuori, 1979

References

Aphrodinae
Cicadellidae genera